Vladimír Trabalík (born 2 November 2002) is a Slovak professional footballer who currently plays for Fortuna Liga club MŠK Žilina as a forward.

Club career

MŠK Žilina
Trabalík made his Fortuna Liga debut for Žilina against ViOn Zlaté Moravce on 22 May 2021. He came on in the second half, replacing Ján Bernát. The match resulted in a decisive 5:1 victory.

References

External links
 MŠK Žilina official club profile 
 
 Futbalnet profile 
 

2002 births
Living people
People from Trstená
Sportspeople from the Žilina Region
Slovak footballers
Association football forwards
MŠK Žilina players
2. Liga (Slovakia) players
Slovak Super Liga players